Hans Ferdinand Junkermann (24 February 1872 – 12 June 1943) was a German actor. He was married to the Austrian actress Julia Serda.

Selected filmography

 Where Is Coletti? (1913)
 The Seeds of Life (1918)
 The Girl from Acker Street (1920)
 The Love Affairs of Hector Dalmore (1921)
 Hamlet (1921)
 Hazard (1921)
 The Eternal Struggle (1921)
 Playing with Fire (1921)
 Lola Montez, the King's Dancer (1922)
 Miss Rockefeller Is Filming (1922)
 Maciste and the Silver King's Daughter (1922)
 The Girl with the Mask (1922)
 The Flight into Marriage (1922)
 The Lady and Her Hairdresser (1922)
 The Woman on the Panther (1923)
 Das Milliardensouper (1923)
 Nanon (1924)
 The Stolen Professor (1924)
 Darling of the King (1924)
 The Great Unknown (1924)
Dancing Mad (1925)
 The Girl with a Patron (1925)
 Express Train of Love (1925)
 The Salesgirl from the Fashion Store (1925)
 Love and Trumpets (1925)
 The Girl on the Road (1925)
 Women of Luxury (1925)
 The Adventure of Mr. Philip Collins (1925)
 The Farmer from Texas (1925)
 The Old Ballroom (1925)
 Grandstand for General Staff (1926)
 Annemarie and Her Cavalryman (1926)
 People to Each Other (1926)
 Princess Trulala (1926)
 The Princess of the Riviera (1926)
 Chaste Susanne (1926)
 The Blue Danube (1926)
 The Mistress (1927)
 His Late Excellency (1927)
 The Prince of Pappenheim (1927)
 Fabulous Lola (1927)
 The Orlov (1927)
 Serenissimus and the Last Virgin (1928)
 The Beloved of His Highness (1928)
 Darling of the Dragoons (1928)
 It Attracted Three Fellows (1928)
 Parisiennes (1928)
 Marriage (1928)
 Love's Masquerade (1928)
 Love in May (1928)
 Scampolo (1928)
 Mikosch Comes In (1928)
 The Story of a Little Parisian (1928)
 The Man with the Frog (1929)
 What's Wrong with Nanette? (1929)
 My Sister and I (1929)
 The Black Domino (1929)
 Sinful and Sweet (1929)
 The Circus Princess (1929)
 Waltz of Love (1930)
 The Love Waltz (1930)
 Him or Me (1930)
 Delicatessen (1930)
 Retreat on the Rhine (1930)
 Anna Christie (1931)
 Shadows of the Underworld (1931)
 Ash Wednesday (1931)
 The Battle of Bademunde (1931)
 Johann Strauss (1931)
 Die Fledermaus (1931)
 The Countess of Monte Cristo (1932)
 Mamsell Nitouche (1932)
 Overnight Sensation (1932)
 No Money Needed (1932)
 The Dancer of Sanssouci (1932)
 The Flower of Hawaii (1933)
 Wedding at Lake Wolfgang (1933)
 A Song for You (1933)
 The Page from the Dalmasse Hotel (1933)
 The Csardas Princess (1934)
 Music in the Blood (1934)
 Just Once a Great Lady (1934)
 The Last Waltz (1934)
 A Woman Who Knows What She Wants (1934)
 The Young Count (1935)
 Winter Night's Dream (1935)
 Regine (1935)
 The King's Prisoner (1935)
Peter, Paul and Nanette (1935)
 My Life for Maria Isabella (1935)
 Girls in White (1936)
 A Wedding Dream (1936)
 A Woman of No Importance (1936)
 The Divine Jetta (1937)
 Serenade (1937)
 The Man Who Was Sherlock Holmes (1937)
 The Impossible Mister Pitt (1938)
 Woman at the Wheel (1939)
 The Scoundrel (1939)
 Madame Butterfly (1939)
 Target in the Clouds (1939)
 Passion (1940)
 Bismarck (1940)
 Bismarck's Dismissal (1942)
 Bravo Acrobat! (1943)

External links
 

1872 births
1943 deaths
German male stage actors
German male film actors
German male silent film actors
Male actors from Stuttgart
20th-century German male actors